Ampanihy or Ampanihy Ouest is a town in the Atsimo-Andrefana Region, Madagascar. It is home of the Ampanihy Airport and is crossed by the Route Nationale 10.

Economy
The weaving of rugs from mohair is the most important economic activity since 1914.

References

Populated places in Atsimo-Andrefana